The U.S. Senate Environment and Public Works Subcommittee on Green Jobs and the New Economy was a subcommittee of the U.S. Senate Committee on Environment and Public Works.

Jurisdiction

According to the Committee's website:

Responsibility for issues related to job creation through the development and deployment of “green” technologies and practices. Issues also include federal investment in technologies and practices that reduce the government’s carbon footprint or the emission of other pollutants, including technologies and practices that enhance energy efficiency, conservation, or renewable power sources.

Members, 114th Congress

References

External links
Official Subcommittee page

See also

Environment and Public Works Green Jobs and the New Economy